Edriss Saleh Titi (born 22 March 1957 in Acre, Israel) is an Arab-Israeli mathematician. He is Professor of Nonlinear Mathematical Science at the University of Cambridge. He also holds the Arthur Owen Professorship of Mathematics at Texas A&M University, and serves as Professor of Computer Science and Applied Mathematics at the Weizmann Institute of Science and Professor Emeritus at the University of California, Irvine.

Selected works

References

External links
 

1957 births
Applied mathematicians
Arab citizens of Israel
Fellows of the Society for Industrial and Applied Mathematics
Indiana University Bloomington alumni
Israeli expatriates in the United States
Israeli mathematicians
People from Acre, Israel
Technion – Israel Institute of Technology alumni
Texas A&M University faculty
University of California, Irvine faculty
Academic staff of Weizmann Institute of Science
Living people
Cambridge mathematicians